Walter Wangerin Jr. (February 13, 1944 – August 5, 2021) was an American author and educator best known for his religious novels and children's books.

Biography
Wangerin was born in Portland, Oregon, where his father was a Lutheran pastor. He was the oldest of seven children. The family moved often, so Walter grew up in various locations including Shelton, Washington, Chicago, Illinois, Grand Forks, North Dakota, Edmonton, Alberta, Milwaukee, Wisconsin and Fort Wayne, Indiana. In 1968, he attained an M.A. in English literature from Miami University, Oxford, Ohio. He went on to study at Concordia Seminary and Christ Seminary-Seminex, both in St. Louis, Missouri. He attained his M.Div. from the latter in 1976. From 1970 to 1991, Wangerin taught English at the University of Evansville, Indiana. From 1977 to 1985, he was the pastor of Evansville's Grace Lutheran Church. While in Evansville he wrote a weekly column for The Evansville Press and hosted an evening radio show on WNIN-FM.

He has been a professor at Valparaiso University, Valparaiso, Indiana since 1991, where he taught literature, theology,  and creative writing, and was writer-in-residence. Wangerin was honored in 2009 by being selected one of Valpo's 150 Most Influential Persons.

Wangerin is the author of more than thirty novels, numerous children's books, and a handful of plays, and he has received several awards for his short stories and essays.  He has been a college professor, a radio announcer, a book reviewer, a pastor of a Lutheran church, and has also taken part in cultural ceremonies such as a Lakota Sun-Dance.

Most of his writing has been religious, primarily giving theological guidance on subjects such as marriage, meditation, parenting, and grieving. Other religious books concern the events in the Bible.

Wangerin passed away on August 5, 2021.

Awards

Wangerin is probably known best for his fables The Book of the Dun Cow and its sequel The Book of Sorrows. The Book of the Dun Cow won a U.S. National Book Award in the one-year category Science Fiction. In 1986, Valparaiso University awarded Wangerin an honorary doctorate.

His Letters from the Land of Cancer received the Award of Merit in the Spirituality category of the 2011 Christianity Today Book Awards.

The Evangelical Christian Publishers Association awarded Wangerin six Gold Medallions (now Christian Book Awards) in several categories.
 1986, Potter, children's books
 1988, As For Me and My House, marriage and family
 1993, Reliving the Passion, devotional
 1997, The Book of God, fiction
 1999, Growing Deeper series, inspirational
 2001, Paul, a Novel, fiction

Books
 

Religious books
Ragman and Other Cries of Faith (1984; 2004)
Miz Lil And The Chronicles Of Grace (1988)
Little Lamb, Who Made Thee? (1993; 2004)
Mourning into Dancing (1992)
Reliving the Passion (1992)
The Book of God: The Bible as a Novel (1996)
The Simple Truth: A Bare Bones Bible (1996)
Orphean Passages (1996)
The Manger is Empty (1998) 
Whole Prayer (1998)
Preparing for Jesus (1999)
Prayerbook For Husbands And Wives (2000)
As for Me and My House: Crafting a Marriage to Last (2001)
Paul: A Novel (2000)
Jesus: A Novel (2005)
The Crying for a Vision (2003)
This Earthly Pilgrimage (2003)
In The Days Of The Angels (2007)
Father and Son: Finding Freedom (2008)
Naomi and Her Daughters (2010)
Letters from the Land of Cancer (2010)
Beate Not the Poore Desk: A Writer to Young Writers (2016)

Poetry
The Absolute, Relatively Inaccessible (2017)
On an Age-Old Anvil: Wince and Sing (2018)

Fantasy novels
 The Book of the Dun Cow (1978)
 The Book of Sorrows (1985)
 The Third Book of the Dun Cow: Peace at the Last (2013)

Children's books/stories
Bible for Children (1981; 2003)
Thistle (1983; 1995)
Potter (1985; 1994)
Elisabeth and the Water Troll (1991)
In the Beginning, There Was No Sky (1997)
Mary's First Christmas (1998)
The Bedtime Rhyme (1998)
Water, Come Down (1999)
Peter's First Easter (2000)
Swallowing The Golden Stone (2001)
Angels and All Children (2002)
Probity Jones And The Fear Not Angel (2005)
I Am My Grandpa's Enkelin (2007)

Historical fiction
Saint Julian (2003)

See also

Notes

References

External links
 
 Walter Wangerin, Jr., Professor at Department of English, Valaparaiso University
 Walter Wangerin at Paraclete Press
 Walter Wangerin at Christianbook.com
 Walter Wangerin at Library of Congress Authorities — with 63 catalog records

1944 births
2021 deaths
20th-century American Lutheran clergy
National Book Award winners
People from Grand Forks, North Dakota
Writers from Milwaukee
Valparaiso University faculty
Miami University alumni
American male writers